Travis Etienne Jr. (born January 26, 1999) is an American football running back for the Jacksonville Jaguars of the National Football League (NFL). He played college football at Clemson and was selected by the Jaguars in the first round of the 2021 NFL Draft.

Early years
Etienne was raised in Jennings, Louisiana and is of Louisiana Creole ancestry. His father works for a well service company in the oil industry, while his mother, Donnetta is a nurse.

Etienne attended Jennings High School in Jennings, Louisiana. As a senior, he rushed for 2,459 yards with 39 touchdowns. For his career, he had 8,864 total yards with 115 total touchdowns. He was rated as a four-star recruit and the 15th highest-rated running back recruit in the country by the 247Sports.com Composite, which aggregates the ratings of the major recruiting services. Etienne committed to Clemson University to play college football on January 21, 2017.

Travis' younger brother Trevor is a freshman running back for the University of Florida Gators football.

College career

Freshman year
As a freshman at Clemson in 2017, Etienne led the team in rushing with 766 yards on 107 carries with 13 touchdowns.

Sophomore year
As a sophomore in 2018, he was a key member of a Clemson team that won the national championship. Etienne rushed for 1,659 yards on the year and had an FBS-leading 24 rushing touchdowns. He had an additional two receiving touchdowns, bringing his total touchdowns from scrimmage to 26, which also led FBS. After winning the 2018 ACC Championship Game against Pitt, Etienne was named the MVP of the game.  Etienne was named ACC Player of the Year and ACC Offensive Player of the Year following the regular season. He was named a first-team All-American by Sporting News and ESPN, and was a consensus second-team All-American.

Junior year
Etienne started his junior year at Clemson with a career-high 205 yards and three touchdowns in the first game of the season. He bested this in a November 2 game against Wofford, when he ran for 212 yards and two touchdowns on just 9 attempts (23.6 yards per attempt). He became the first Clemson running back to have three career 200-yard games. At the conclusion of the regular season, Etienne was named ACC Player of the Year, ACC Offensive Player of the Year, and first-team All-ACC; all for the second consecutive year. He is the first Clemson player to win consecutive ACC Player of the Year awards since Steve Fuller in 1977–78. Etienne ended his junior season with 1,614 rushing yards and an ACC-leading 19 rushing touchdowns. His 7.8 yards-per-carry were second most in FBS.

Despite projections that Etienne would enter the 2020 NFL Draft, he announced on January 17, 2020, that he would return to Clemson for his senior year.

Senior year
On October 31, 2020, in a 34-28 win over Boston College, Etienne finished with two touchdowns and a career-high 264 all-purpose yards. With the performance, he scored a touchdown in 42 games, breaking Donnel Pumphrey's record for most in FBS history. He finished his career with touchdowns scored in 46 games.  With his 4,952 career rushing yards Etienne also broke the ACC career rushing record previously held by Ted Brown. He also set ACC career records for rushing touchdowns (70), total touchdowns (78), and total points scored (468).  He scored at least one touchdown in 46 of 55 career games, setting the FBS and NCAA records.

College statistics

Professional career

Etienne officially declared for the 2021 NFL Draft in January 2021. He was selected by the Jacksonville Jaguars with the 25th overall selection, which they previously obtained from a trade that sent Jalen Ramsey to the Los Angeles Rams. This reunited Etienne with his college quarterback Trevor Lawrence, who was taken by the Jaguars first overall in the same draft. On May 15, Jaguars coach Urban Meyer announced that Etienne would spend the Jaguars minicamp as a wide receiver, rather than a running back. On July 19, 2021, Etienne signed his four-year rookie contract with the Jaguars, worth $12.9 million.

During the Jaguars second preseason game against the New Orleans Saints, Etienne suffered a Lisfranc injury and was subsequently ruled out indefinitely. It was later revealed that Etienne had suffered a significant tear in the lisfranc zone of his foot, which required surgery, and prematurely ended his 2021 season. He was placed on season-ending injured reserve later in the day.

Etienne made his professional debut in the Jaguars' 2022 season opener against the Washington Commanders and had four carries for 47 rushing yards.

Etienne recorded his first career touchdown in week 7 against the New York Giants, adding 14 carries for 114 yards and 1 lost fumble in the 23-17 loss. This marked the first time in his NFL career that he recorded a touchdown and over 100 yards in an NFL game. After a trade with the New York Jets involving Jaguars running back James Robinson, Etienne was named the starting running back in Jacksonville.

NFL career statistics

Regular season

References

External links
 

Jacksonville Jaguars bio
Clemson Tigers bio

1999 births
Living people
People from Jennings, Louisiana
Players of American football from Louisiana
American football running backs
Clemson Tigers football players
All-American college football players
Jacksonville Jaguars players
Louisiana Creole people
Ed Block Courage Award recipients